Nimrod Borenstein (born in 1969) is a British-French-Israeli composer whose music is widely performed throughout Europe, the US, Canada, Australia and Japan. His works are becoming part of the repertoire of many ensembles and orchestras.

Education
Born in Tel Aviv, Nimrod Borenstein grew up in Paris where he started his musical education at the age of 3. In 1984 he became a Laureat of the Cziffra Foundation and subsequently moved to London in 1986 to pursue his studies as a violinist with Itzhak Rashkovsky at the Royal College of Music. He was then awarded the highest scholarship from the Leverhulme Trust to study composition with Paul Patterson at the Royal Academy. He is now an Associate of the Academy and is listed amongst the alumni as an illustrious past student.

Composer
Vladimir Ashkenazy has been a supporter of Borenstein's music for many years. In 2013 Ashkenazy conducted the Philharmonia Orchestra for a performance of The Big Bang and Creation of the Universe. Later that year he conducted the Philharmonia Orchestra at the Royal Festival Hall in the world premiere of If you will it, it is no dream.

The past few years  have seen Nimrod Borenstein's compositions premiered and performed at the Royal Opera House and the Royal Festival Hall in London, the Salle Gaveau in Paris and the Carnegie Hall in New York. His works have also featured in numerous music festivals across Europe such as It's All About Piano in London, the Burgos International Music Festival and Belgrade Cello Fest.

Borenstein's Shell Adagio (published by Boosey & Hawkes) has been played by 16 different orchestras, including a concert at Carnegie Hall. In 2014 his Violin concerto was premiered by Dmitry Sitkovetsky and the Oxford Philomusica conducted by Marios Papadopoulos at the Sheldonian Theatre in Oxford.

A particular highlight of the 2014/15 season was the world premiere at the Royal Opera House of Suspended, a work written for Gandini Juggling's 4 x 4: Ephemeral Architectures show. A huge international success, Suspended has had to date more than 200 performances (from the Edinburgh International Festival to the Taipei Arts Festival etc.).

Nimrod Borenstein is currently engaged in a multi-year ‘24 Piano Etudes’ project - the first 12 to be recorded and released by Naxos in 2022.

Nimrod Borenstein's substantial catalogue currently numbers over ninety works including orchestral and chamber music as well as vocal and solo instrumental pieces.

Discography
 Nimrod Borenstein: Concerto for Violin and Orchestra opus 60, The Big Bang and Creation of the Universe opus 52, If you will it, it is no dream opus 58. The Oxford Philharmonic Orchestra, Vladimir Ashkenazy, Irmina Trynkos. Chandos (2017)
 Nimrod Borenstein: Concerto for Piano and Orchestra opus 91, Shirim op. 94 (for piano solo), Light and Darkness opus 80 (fro piano quintet). The Royal Philharmonic Orchestra, Nimrod Borenstein (conductor), Clelia Iruzun (piano), I Musicanti. Somm (2023)
 Nimrod Borenstein: Quasi una cadenza opus 26 for violin solo. Nuné Melik. Bourget Music (2022)
 Nimrod Borenstein: Kaddish opus 78 and Quasi una cadenza opus 26 for violin solo. Olga Dubossarskaya Kaler. Centaur Records (2022)
 Nimrod Borenstein: Lullaby opus 81c for violin, saxophone and piano. Kugoni Trio. Etcetera Records (2021)
 Nimrod Borenstein: Cieli d’Italia opus 88. Quartetto di Cremona. Avie Records (2020)
 Nimrod Borenstein: Reminiscences of childhood opus 54. Nadav Hertzka, piano. Skarbo (2019)  
 Nimrod Borenstein: Concerto for piano, trumpet and string orchestra opus 74. The English Symphony Orchestra conducted by Kenneth Woods, Simon Desbruslais (trumpet), Clare Hammond (piano). Signum Classics (2017)
 Nimrod Borenstein: Suspended opus 69. das freie orchester Berlin, Laércio Diniz. Solaire Records (2015)
 Nimrod Borenstein: Quasi una cadenza opus 26. Thomas Gould, violin. Champs Hill Records
 Nimrod Borenstein: Duo concertant opus 73.  Sanja Romic, oboe & Fionnuala Moynihan, piano. HedoneRecords (2017)
 Nimrod Borenstein: Perpetua opus 29  for flute, viola & harp. Debussy Trio. Klavier Records (2010)
 Nimrod Borenstein: Shell Adagio opus 17 for string orchestra. Florida All-State Middle School Orchestra, James Mick conductor. Mark Records (2017)

Publishers

Nimrod Borenstein publishers include:

 Donemus 
 Boosey & Hawkes 
 Alain Van Kerckhoven Éditeur

References

Further reading
"Nimrod Borenstein invites you to follow his Etudes journey" Gramophone October 2020
"Composer Nimrod Borenstein talks about using illustrated notation in his new string quartet" The Strad November 2020
Interview with Nimrod Borenstein for crosseyedpianist
Nimrod Borenstein: how composers can use the scientific method
Interview with Nimrod Borenstein for primephonic

1969 births
Living people
21st-century composers
Israeli composers
Composers for piano
People from Tel Aviv
Alumni of the Royal College of Music

External links
 – Nimrod Borenstein official site